The British League Pairs Championship was a  speedway contest between the top two riders from each club competing in the British League in the UK, or the top division thereof when it had multiple divisions. The meetings comprised a competition between teams of two riders, in some years with qualification for the final via two semi-finals. The competition was first staged in 1976, when Ipswich Witches won, but was dropped from the speedway calendar after the 1978 final. The competition was revived in 1984 and continued until 1988.

Winners

Meeting abandoned after 14 heats due to fog, result stands

See also
 List of United Kingdom Speedway Pairs champions
 Elite League Pairs Championship

References

Speedway competitions in the United Kingdom